Melvin Russell Ballard Jr. (born October 8, 1928) is an American businessman and religious leader who is currently the Acting President of the Quorum of the Twelve Apostles of the Church of Jesus Christ of Latter-day Saints (LDS Church).  He has been a member of the church's Quorum of the Twelve Apostles since 1985. As a member of the Quorum of the Twelve, Ballard is accepted by church members as a prophet, seer, and revelator. Currently, he is the third most senior apostle in the church.

Biography

Ballard was born in Salt Lake City, Utah, to Melvin Russell Ballard and his wife, Geraldine Smith. As a young man, Ballard served as a missionary in England from 1948 to 1950, during which he was a counselor in the mission presidency. He met his wife while they were studying at the University of Utah. Over the following years Ballard served in multiple positions in the LDS Church, including twice as a bishop. In 1974, Ballard was called as president of the church's Canada Toronto Mission. While serving as a mission president in 1976, he was called to the First Quorum of the Seventy; he completed his three-year term as mission president as a member of the seventy. Among other assignments as a seventy he was the editor of the church's magazines from the start of 1980 until the end of 1984. He was a member of the Presidency of the Seventy from 1980 until 1985. As a general authority, Ballard was also president of the church's International Mission and the executive director of the church's missionary department.

Following the death of apostle Bruce R. McConkie, Ballard was sustained to the Quorum of the Twelve Apostles on October 6, 1985, and ordained an apostle on October 10, 1985.

Ballard is the grandson of apostles Melvin J. Ballard and Hyrum M. Smith. Through Smith, Ballard is a descendant of Hyrum Smith, brother of church founder Joseph Smith. Among other assignments as an apostle Ballard oversaw the church's celebration of the Pioneer Sesquicentennial in 1997.

Following the January 2018 death of church president Thomas S. Monson, the church's First Presidency was reorganized with Russell M. Nelson as president. Nelson selected Dallin H. Oaks, the next senior apostle and new quorum president, as First Counselor in the First Presidency. As the next senior apostle not in the First Presidency, Ballard became the quorum's acting president.

Business activities
Professionally, Ballard was involved in several enterprises, including automotive, real estate, and investment businesses. He was the top-selling salesman for his father's Nash car dealership when he left it in the early 1950s to pursue other business interests. In 1956, Ballard returned and took over the Ballard Motor Company from his father. During this period he also served in the United States Army Reserve, resigning his commission as a First Lieutenant in 1957.

During the late 1950s, Ballard was recruited by the Ford Motor Company to become the first Edsel car dealer for Salt Lake City. According to Ballard, after praying for guidance, he had the "clear impression" not to sign the franchise. He did anyway and incurred a huge loss, "without doubt the darkest period" of his business career.

In 1961, Ballard was the president of Keystone Securities Corporation in Salt Lake City. The Securities and Exchange Commission opened an investigation into Keystone in 1962 after accusations that Ballard and  Keystone had violated the Securities and Exchange Act of 1934 and the Securities Act of 1933. The investigation centered around "manipulation and fraud."  The SEC completed its investigation in 1963. Keystone, with Ballard as the primary cause, was found to have violated the Securities Act of 1933 in the following charges: providing false statements to the SEC, and aiding and abetting Shasta Mineral and Chemical Company in making false statements that included misrepresenting the relationships of the Shasta officers with both Ballard and Keystone.  The SEC revoked the broker-dealer registration of Keystone as a result.

One highlight of Ballard's business career was his presidency of the Valley Music Hall in Bountiful, Utah, which offered family entertainment. There Ballard worked with Art Linkletter, Danny Thomas, Bob Cummings, and other Hollywood celebrities who were advisers to the enterprise. Although the music hall failed financially, investors recovered their money when the LDS Church purchased the building.

Family

On August 28, 1951, Ballard married Barbara Bowen in the Salt Lake Temple; they are the parents of seven children. One of their daughters, Brynn, is married to Peter R. Huntsman, who is the son of late billionaire industrialist Jon Huntsman Sr. and brother of Jon Huntsman Jr., a United States Ambassador and former Governor of Utah. Barbara Bowen Ballard died on October 1, 2018.

Works
Books

See also

 Church Educational System
 Council on the Disposition of the Tithes

Notes

References

"Elder Melvin Russell Ballard Jr., Of the First Quorum of the Seventy", Ensign, May 1976

External links
General Authorities and General Officers: President M. Russell Ballard churchofjesuschrist.org
Newsroom of LDS Church

1928 births
20th-century Mormon missionaries
American Mormon missionaries in Canada
American Mormon missionaries in England
American general authorities (LDS Church)
Apostles (LDS Church)
Latter Day Saints from Utah
Living people
Members of the First Quorum of the Seventy (LDS Church)
Mission presidents (LDS Church)
People from Salt Lake City
Presidents of the Seventy (LDS Church)
Smith family (Latter Day Saints)
University of Utah alumni